Myristamine oxide is an amine oxide based zwitterionic surfactant with a C14 (tetradecyl) alkyl tail. It is used as a foam stabilizer and hair conditioning agent in some shampoos and conditioners. Like other amine oxide based surfactants it is antimicrobial, being slightly more effective than lauryldimethylamine oxide against the common bacteria S. aureus and E. coli.

See also
Lauryldimethylamine oxide – An analogous compound with a C12 tail

References

Amine oxides
Cosmetics chemicals
Surfactants